The LuAZ-967 was the Transporter of the Front Line, a small Soviet four-wheel drive amphibious vehicle. Light enough to be air transportable, it had a  payload over most terrain.

History
The design originated after the Korean War, when the Soviets saw a need for small off-road vehicles comparable to the American Jeep, to supplement the overly-large and -heavy GAZ-69s then in service. It was to be used by Soviet Airborne Forces (VDV) for casualty evacuation, munition supply and the transport of light armaments.

Developed at NAMI (the National Automobile Institute), the prototype, known as NAMI 049, was completed in 1958. Unlike the Jeep, it had a Fibreglass body, four-wheel torsion bar independent suspension, and permanent four-wheel drive with locking hubs. Trials proved it underpowered, and the body too fragile.

A second prototype, the NAMI 049A, had a  V4 MeMZ 965 engine (selected for use in the ZAZ-965), steel body, and rear wheel drive (with optional drive to the front wheels). The torsion bars were replaced with a coil spring setup.

It was produced between 1961–1975 at Lutsk automobile plant - LuAZ. It was succeeded by the LuAZ-969В, LuAZ-969, LuAZ-969М and the LuAZ-1302.

Modifications
 LuAZ-967A — modernized high-powered engine MeMZ-967А
 LuAZ-967M — modernized ЛуАЗ-967А with the same engine.
 Geolog - a special 6-wheel version was built .

Mechanical
The LuAZ 967M had a MeMZ-967A  gasoline engine from the ZAZ automobile. An air-cooled, carbureted ohv V4, it developed  at 2,250 rpm.

A 4+1 speed transmission has separately engaged crawl gear. Unlike many small military vehicles, it was a front wheel drive 4×2, the rear axle was selectively engaged only when 4×4 was needed.

The driving controls were on the truck's centerline, both the controls and the windshield could be folded down for a lower profile.

References

Sources

External links

  LuAZ-967 Verwundetentransporter photos
  LuAZ cross-country vehicles

1960s cars
1970s cars
Soviet automobiles
Military vehicles of the Soviet Union
Wheeled amphibious vehicles
Military vehicles introduced in the 1960s